Budge Manzia (born 24 September 1994) is a Congolese international football player who currently plays for SFC Opava. He has represented DR Congo internationally.

Career
At club level, Manzia played in the Tunisian Ligue Professionnelle 1 for Étoile du Sahel before moving to the Czech Republic to join FK Dukla Prague in January 2014. He joined Baník Sokolov of the second league on loan in July 2015. He scored in their first game of the 2015–16 Czech National Football League, a 1–0 win against FK Pardubice. Manzia scored a hattrick in Sokolov's 3–0 win against Varnsdorf in November 2015 before his loan spell expired. In April 2016, Manzia scored his first Czech First League goal in a 2–2 draw at Mladá Boleslav. He scored the second goal of the game in the 11th minute after a cross from Jakub Mareš, having provided the pass to Mareš for the first goal earlier in the game. In the winter break of the 2016–17 season, Manzia joined second-tier side SK Sigma Olomouc, signing a -year contract.

Manzia represented the Democratic Republic of the Congo in a friendly versus Burkina Faso on 14 November 2012. Following his debut he was named in the Congolese squad for the 2013 Africa Cup of Nations but did not play. He was also named in the Congolese squad for 2013 African U-20 Championship.

References

External links

1994 births
Democratic Republic of the Congo footballers
Democratic Republic of the Congo expatriate footballers
Democratic Republic of the Congo international footballers
Association football forwards
Étoile Sportive du Sahel players
2013 African U-20 Championship players
Living people
Czech First League players
FK Dukla Prague players
FK Baník Sokolov players
SK Sigma Olomouc players
SFC Opava players
Expatriate footballers in the Czech Republic
Sharks XI FC players
21st-century Democratic Republic of the Congo people